The Happiness Tour is the first concert tour by British band Hurts in support of their debut album Happiness. At the end of February 2010 Hurts played four concerts in the UK and Germany, and in April and May they joined the NME Radar tour, then they resumed their recitals and played at the festivals in Europe and Asia, including a debut performance at the festival in Japan. Since October, a variety of solo artists and groups increasingly began to play as the opening acts at Hurts' gigs, and by the end of 2010 Hurts themselves supported Scissor Sisters in their UK arena tour. In April 2011, Hurts held their debut performance in the US at the festival Coachella, and in May 2011 Hurts made an Asian tour, which was followed by a series of European summer festivals. 4 November 2011 was the final performance of a two-year Happiness Tour, in London Kylie Minogue joined the group to perform a duet of two songs. In 2012, the band played at a few summer music festivals.

Background 
Description of performance, scenery
During the whole show Theo Hutchcraft throws in a crowd white roses on long stems with cut off spikes, there are usually about 10 pieces in a rider. During "Evelyn" he breaks a microphone stand. Before "Illuminated" he asks the crowd to light their phones. On Theo's left hand there is Adam Anderson, he performs most of the songs while sitting at the synthesizer placed on a transparent plastic base, but at "Evelyn" he gets up and plays the guitar, after that he throws a mediator in a crowd. Encore they perform song "Better Than Love".

At the first legs of the tour Hurts usually play against a white screen, in time complemented by the same illuminated pillars of white fabric. Since 27 June 2010 at large numbers of concerts Hurts hang up the backdrop of stage with a large black linen with a white band logo on it.
At the first shows Theo appears with the accessories – a white scarf and a comb in his pocket, during the tour there are also appears black leather gloves, and at summer festivals Theo and Adam often perform wearing sunglasses "Ray-Ban". Adam sometimes wears a black scarf, bow tie or bolo tie, and a long black overcoat.

From the beginning of February 2011 Theo begin to appear on stage wear a cape draped over the suit. At the same time for a while, till 19 March 2011, the usual Hurts' scenery with highlighted cloth pillars are replaced by big blinds, on which silhouettes of the dancers from their second video for "Wonderful Life" are projected. Since 1 October 2011 blinds are replaced by a big banner with a house with big windows printed on it.

On some summer festivals in 2012 images of glowing broken and crossing lines, and a variety of videos including their video clips are projected on the screens.

Musicians and dancers
From the first show and till 6 August 2011 Hurts are accompanied by back-vocalist Richard Sidaway, who stays the whole show without any move, he also sings the second part of the song called "Verona", invariably there are keyboarder Pete Watson and drummer Paul Walsham.
9 October 2010 at O2 Shepherd's Bush Empire in London on "Wonderful Life" there were a female saxophonist and a female dancer dressed like the girl from the debut black-and-white video of "Wonderful Life". Her dance is a mix of styles waacking and vogue.

Since 2 February 2011 show at Brighton Dome in United Kingdom at many gigs there are a male bass guitarist and a female viola player on stage with Hurts.

3 June 2011 at the first summer festival named Rock im Park in Germany the band joined by two female dancers, two violinists and one cellist on a permanent basis, one of the girls also played the harp.
The orchestra plays solo parts at the opening track "Intro music", at instrumental part of the song "The Water" and at the song with a grim history "Gloomy Sunday".

Dancers appear on stage dressed in long black robes wear hoods during "Intro music" holding the black flags. On the first song "Silver Lining" they stay on the scene on their knees with their hands folded in prayer. On "Gloomy Sunday" they go on stage in black tutus and en pointes with long red ribbons tied around their wrists and stay to dance on stage during the song "Better Than Love". In 2012 they put on red dresses for the song "Devotion".

Special performances
The song "Devotion" had two special performance during the tour:
– for the first time it was a duet with Clare Maguire, who supported Hurts at the gig at Oran Mor in Glasgow, 4 October 2010;
– the second time was at the final show of the 2011 leg and it was a duet with Kylie Minogue at Brixton Academy in London, 4 November 2011. Also they sang together Kylie Minogue' song "Confide in Me".

17 November 2010 at Union Chapel in London, United Kingdom Adam Anderson was absent due to he has thrown his back out after trying to carry an old piano. It was the first Hurts' acoustic concert. That day Tali Lennox was on scene, she sat on the chair and plucked rose petals.
15 January 2011 at The Shibuya DUO Music Exchange in Tokyo, Japan Adam Anderson was absent due to his tooth accident.

Hurts used red confetti at their show at Somerset House in London, 14 July 2011, Edward Bovingdon wrote in gig review: "Theatre dramatics came in the form of sexy ballerinas during intervals and a wave of red confetti ended the evening with a shower of symbolic blood."; glow sticks, confetti and fireworks at Zitadelle Spandau, in Berlin, 13 August 2011; fireworks at Brixton Academy in London, 4 November 2011.

On 8 November 2011 Hurts wrote at Facebook:

Reception 
Critics mostly took the Happiness tour positively, unanimously made special mention of attention to the details of the show and consistency of the performance in the same style, the performances of the band even secured the definition "The Theatre of Hurts". Musicians call themselves the same way.

Opening acts 
There were more than 40 supporting acts for the tour. They are:

 New Young Pony Club (London, 10 June 2010)
 Clare Maguire (Glasgow, 2–4 October 2010; UK, Ireland, 2–8 February 2011; Germany, select March 2011 dates)
 (we are) Performance (UK, 5–9 October 2010)
 Handsome Poets (Amsterdam, 10 October 2010)
 Noonie Bao (Stockholm, 16 October 2010)
 Roman Fischer (Germany, 18–22 October 2010 dates)
 Stereo Grand (Brussels, 30 October 2010; Luxembourg, 31 October 2010)
 Kamp! (Poland, 21–22 January 2011)
 Shadowplay! (Gdańsk, 23 January 2011)
 Shirubi Ikazuchi (Tallinn, 25 January 2011)
 TV OFF (Helsinki, 26 January 2011)
 Saint Saviour (UK, Ireland select February 2011 dates; London, 14 July 2011)
 Stendhal Syndrome and Alba G. Corral (Spain, 12–13 February 2011)
 The Eleanors (Porto, 15 February 2011)
 Too Young To Love (Bologna, 18 February 2011)
 Harvey Quinnt (Brussels, 1 March 2011)
 Pien Feith (Groningen, 2 March 2011)

 Rara Avis (Praha, 13 March 2011)
 Bunny Lake (Vienna, 15 March 2011)
 Lovers Electric (Munich, 16 March 2011; Berlin, 13 August 2011)
 Rimer London (Amsterdam, 19 March 2011)
 Cata.Pirata (Amsterdam, 19 March 2011)
 Dikta (Reykjavík, 20 March 2011)
 Retro Stefson (Reykjavík, 20 March 2011)
 Inje (Belgrade, 25 May 2011)
 Jack Beauregard (Germany, 5,7 June 2011)
 Gaggle (London, 14 July 2011)
 A Forest  (Dortmund, 27 July 2011)
 Kensington Road  (Dortmund, 27 July 2011)
 Firefox AK  (Berlin, 13 August 2011; select September, October 2011 dates)
 The Heartbreaks (select October 2011 dates)
 SuperXiu (Poznań, 9 October 2011)
 Nефть (Russia, 17–18 October 2011)
 NipplePeople (Zagreb, 23 October 2011)
 Niki & the Dove (UK, 2–4 November 2011)
 Jess Mills (UK, 2–4 November 2011)

Setlist 
During the tour the setlist was expanded more than two times.

Tour dates 

Notes
This performance is a part of the NME Radar tour.
The show in Birmingham was originally scheduled at The Library, but it was moved to the HMV Institute.
The show in Amsterdam was originally scheduled at the Melkweg, but it was moved to the Paradiso.
The show in Berlin was originally scheduled at the Lido, but it was moved to the Kulturbrauerei.
The show in Cologne was originally scheduled at the Luxor, but it was moved to the Essigfabrik.
The show in Munich was originally scheduled at the 59:1 Munchen, but it was moved to the Theaterfabrik.
The show in Barcelona was originally scheduled at the LA2, but it was moved to the Bikini. 
The show in Madrid was originally scheduled at the Joy Eslava, but it was moved to the Penelope.
The show in Paris was originally scheduled at the La Boule Noir, but it was moved to the Le Trabendo.
Adam Anderson was absent due to he has thrown his back out after trying to carry an old piano.
This performance is a part of The beginning of The Night Work Tour supporting Scissor Sisters.
Adam Anderson was absent due to his tooth accident.
The show in Tallinn was originally scheduled at the Rock Café, but it was moved to the Kalevi Spordihall.
The show in Helsinki was originally scheduled at the Tavastia, but it was moved to The Circus.
The show in Berlin was originally scheduled at the Huxleys, but it was moved to the Columbiahalle.
The show in Cologne was originally scheduled at the E-Werk, but it was moved to the Palladium.
The show in Athens was originally scheduled at the Kyttaro, but it was moved to the Fuzz Club.
The show in Bucharest was originally scheduled at the Silver Church, but it was moved to the Fratelli Studios.
The show in Moscow was originally scheduled at the A2, but it was moved to the Arena Moscow.

Rescheduled dates
8 November 2010 Theo Hutchcraft wrote on Twitter, that he has caused himself a frightening injury – his eardrum has perforated. He will be OK, but the doctor said that if he put strain on it and play a full show, it could be very damaging.

Cancelled dates

Personnel 

Main
 Matt Vines, Neil Reeves – management
 Alan Davies – lightning director (2012)
 Stefan Goodchild – creative coder
 Dan Robinson – lighting designer and video content 
 Lee Birchall – equipment
 Brian Phoenix – financier
 Paul Roberts – choreographer
 Francesca Hoffman, Emily Rumbles – dancers (2011–2012)

Source:

Band
 Theo Hutchcraft – vocal
 Adam Anderson – keyboards, guitar
 Pete Watson – keyboards, backing vocal
 Paul Walsham – drums, backing vocal
 Mark Pusey – drums, backing vocal (2010–2011)
 Richard Sidaway – backing vocal (2010–2011)
 Matt White – bass guitar (2011)
 Dave Marks – bass guitar (2011)
 Lael Goldberg – bass guitar, backing vocal (2012)
 Hilary Marsden – saxophone, clarinet, backing vocal (2010)
 Amy May – clarinet, saxophone, viola, backing vocal (2011–2012)
 Paloma Deike, Penny Anscow – violin, backing vocal (2011–2012)
 Rhian Porter – cello (2011–2012)

References 

2010 concert tours
2011 concert tours
2012 concert tours